Parnells GAA or Parnells Gaelic Athletic Association club   Gaelic football club is a Gaelic Athletic Association club based in Coolock, Dublin, Ireland. It was founded in 1893, named after the recently deceased Charles Stewart Parnell, and at that time was known as Parnell Volunteers. Parnells have won  the Dublin senior football championship on six occasions, in 1913, 1916, 1939, 1945 and most recently in 1987, 1988.

Coming of Age
Within ten years of the club's foundation Parnell's had become well established in Dublin GAA circles. Indeed, as well as competing in local competitions, the club was now competing and contributing players to Dublin as well.

The Dublin Senior football Team winners of the Croke Cup 1897, featuring Joe Teeling of Parnell's

The Dublin Senior Football team of 1902 included three Parnell's players.

Parnell's won the final of the Wolfe Tone Tournament in 1903 against Clane. The same team won the Kiltiernan and Malahide Tournaments.

In 1907-08 Parnell's were the winners of the Junior Football Championship, The Intermediate League and the Martyn Cup.

The Dublin Junior Football Team (Parnell's Selection) won the Leinster Championship in 1908.

Parnell's won the Senior Football Championship in 1913 and 1916.

The Parnell's Junior Team 1916-1917 won the North County League, and were runners-up in the Junior Championship.

Parnell's had two players in the all Ireland Final in 1920.

Parnell's Minor Team 1919–1920 were winners of the Dublin League.

Parnell's in 1924 were winners of the North County League

The Easter Rising
Parnell members that took part in the Easter Rising 1916 were Peader Christie, Owen McDermot, John Joyce, Patrick Lanigan of Artane and Thomas Reilly, John Brien of Donnycarney and Martin Mullen fought in Jacobs. Edmund Boland of Marino and Martin Savage of Co Sligo fought in the GPO. Peter Coates and Charles Kenny of North Strand fought in Stephens Green and Boland's Mills.

In July 1916 three Parnell's men - Peader Christie, Owen McDermot and John Joyce played on a Dublin selection against Wexford prisoners. Shortly afterwards some of the prisoners were released, including men who were to help Parnell's win their second Senior Football Championship.

The Golden Jubilee (1934)

During 1934 GAA members celebrated the Golden Jubilee of the foundation of the association. All clubs were urged to organise their own celebrations during the course of the year.

Unfortunately for Parnell's their senior footballers fared badly in league matches in the first few months of the year. Matters improved somewhat when they defeated Dolphins in the first round of the championship. Success was short-lived. On 20 May 1934 at Croke Park they were beaten 2-4 to 1-6 in the quarter final.

The following year, 1935, the senior footballers lost the first round of the Championship when they were defeated 1-6 to 0-1 by Garda, the eventual winners. Corner Forward Jim Brady of Parnell's was a member of the Dublin Senior Football team beaten by Louth in the 1935 Leinster Championship. The following year did not bring any relief to the club; nevertheless, the officials, selectors and players struggled on manfully in the hope of better times ahead.

During 1937 the club did not enter the junior league or the Championship but concentrated on the Minor and Senior Level. In the first round of the Senior Championship, Parnell's were drawn against Sean Mc Dermott's. Their first encounter ended in a draw, but Sean Mc Dermott's went on to win the replay with ease.

In 1938 Parnell's won the Second Division of the senior Football League. The team was strengthened by the inclusion of ex-St Vincent's minors including Brendan Quinn, Johnny Gibbons, Tom McCann, Pádraig Toolan, Ned Boland, Albert Farrell, Mick Delaney, George Ingham, Robert Hurley, Andy Hanratty and Frank Moore. They met Dolphins in the final of Division II and defeated them by 2-7 to 0-1.

The victories of 1938 paved the way for even greater feats in the memorable year of 1939.

Facilities
In 2012, Parnells acquired the sports fields of Chanel College, adjoining their Coolock clubhouse, and built a new sports complex on the site, consisting of several floodlit all-weather pitches, training facilities, and a social centre. Chanel College now makes use of those facilities. The previous clubhouse, located at the entrance to the new facilities, was demolished in the process. They also have a gym at St. David's CBS school in Artane. 
The club has no connection (other than through the GAA) with Parnell Park in nearby Donnycarney.

Paul Bealin was managing the club in 2013 when he was appointed as manager of the Westmeath senior football team.

Achievements
 Dublin Senior Football Championship: Winners 1913, 1916, 1939, 1945, 1987, 1988
 Dublin Intermediate Football Championship: Winners 2004
 Dublin Junior Football Championship: Winners 1983, 2011
 Dublin Junior B Football Championship Winner 2009
 Dublin Junior C Football Championship Winner 2011
 Dublin Senior Football League Division 1 Winners 1928
 Dublin AFL Div. 5: Winners 2013
 Dublin AFL Div. 6: Winners 2011
 Dublin AFL Div. 8: Winners 2011
 Dublin AFL Div. 10: Winners 2009
 Dublin Senior B Hurling Championship: Winners 2013
 Dublin Junior Hurling Championship Winners 2011
 Dublin Junior B Hurling Championship Winner 2010
 Dublin Junior D Hurling Championship Winner 2010
 Dublin Junior E Hurling Championship Winner 2009

Notable players

Ireland international rules football team players
  Stephen Cluxton

Senior inter-county footballers
{|
|- style="vertical-align:top"
||
Dublin 
  Stephen Cluxton
Galway
  Brian Talty

Senior inter-county ladies' footballers
 
 Niamh McEvoy
 Lindsay Peat

Senior inter-county hurlers
Laois
  Darren Rooney

Others 
Republic of Ireland football international
  Shay Gibbons 
  Jeff Hendrick 
Ireland women's rugby union international
  Lindsay Peat
Politicians
 Charles Haughey, former Taoiseach

References

External links
Parnells GAA Official Website
Official Dublin GAA Website
Dublin ClubGAA

Gaelic games clubs in Dublin (city)
Gaelic football clubs in Dublin (city)